The yellow-rumped tinkerbird (Pogoniulus bilineatus) is a bird species in the family Lybiidae (African barbets), which is native to the moist tropical and subtropical regions of sub-Saharan Africa.

Relationships
It used to be placed in the family Bucconidae (puffbirds), which has been split up; alternatively, it may be included in a vastly expanded Ramphastidae (toucans).

Subspecies
Pogoniulus bilineatus includes the following subspecies:
 P. b. leucolaimus - (Verreaux, J & Verreaux, E, 1851)
 P. b. poensis - (Alexander, 1908)
 P. b. mfumbiri - (Ogilvie-Grant, 1907)
 P. b. jacksoni - (Sharp, 1897)
 P. b. fischeri - (Reichenow, 1880)
 P. b. bilineatus - (Sundevall, 1850)

Range
It is found in Angola, Benin, Burundi, Cameroon, Central African Republic, Republic of the Congo, Democratic Republic of the Congo, Ivory Coast, Equatorial Guinea, Eswatini, Gabon, Gambia, Ghana, Guinea, Guinea-Bissau, Kenya, Liberia, Malawi, Mozambique, Nigeria, Rwanda, Senegal, Sierra Leone, South Africa, South Sudan, Tanzania, Togo, Uganda, Zambia, and Zimbabwe.

Gallery

References

External links

 (Yellow-rumped tinkerbird = ) Golden-rumped tinker barbet - Species text in The Atlas of Southern African Birds

yellow-rumped tinkerbird
Birds of Sub-Saharan Africa
Birds of the Gulf of Guinea
yellow-rumped tinkerbird
Taxonomy articles created by Polbot